Alice Crary (born 1967) is an American philosopher who currently holds the positions of University Distinguished Professor at the Graduate Faculty, The New School for Social Research in New York City and Visiting Fellow at Regent's Park College, University of Oxford, U.K. (where she was Professor of Philosophy 2018–19).

Philosophical work
Crary works in the fields of moral philosophy, feminism, and Wittgenstein scholarship. She has written about cognitive disability,  critical theory,  propaganda,  nonhuman animal cognition,  effective altruism, and the philosophy of literature and narrative.  Her work is especially influenced by Cora Diamond,  John McDowell, Stanley Cavell,  Hilary Putnam, bell hooks,   Kimberlé Crenshaw,   Charles W. Mills, and Peter Winch.

Ethics and moral philosophy
Crary's first monograph, Beyond Moral Judgment, discusses how literature and feminism help to reframe moral presuppositions. Her Inside Ethics argues that ethics in disability studies and animal studies is stunted by a lack of moral imagination, caused by a narrow understanding of rationality and by a philosophy severed from literature and art.

Feminism
Crary's work on feminism is critical of standard views of objectivity in analytic philosophy and post-structuralism. In her view, both traditions mistakenly conceive of objectivity as value-neutral, and thus incompatible with ethical and political perspectives. According to Crary, these "ethically-loaded perspectives" invite both cognitive and ethical appreciation for the lives of women, in ways that count as objective knowledge. Like her moral philosophy, her feminist conception of objectivity is informed by Wittgenstein, who she understands as proposing a "wide" view of objectivity: one in which affective responses are not merely non-cognitive persuasive manipulations but reveal real forms of suffering that give us a more objective understanding of the world.

Wittgenstein
Crary is associated with the so-called "therapeutic"  or "resolute"  reading of Wittgenstein. In her co-edited collection of essays of such readings, The New Wittgenstein, her own contribution argues against the standard use-theory readings of Wittgenstein that often render his thought as politically conservative and implausible. Since then, she has contributed to numerous collections of Wittgenstein scholarship, including Emotions and Understanding and interpretations of Wittgenstein's On Certainty.

Public philosophy
Crary frequently participates in and organizes events for public discussion, such as public debates on the treatment of animals and the cognitively disabled,. She has also written for the New York Times.

Crary has contributed to international educational activities focusing on the intersection of philosophy with critical theory and political philosophy.  These include summer philosophy workshops at Humboldt University in Berlin, Germany, the Transregional Center for Democratic Studies/New School for Social Research Europe Democracy and Diversity Institute in Wroclaw, Poland, and  the  Kritische Theorie in Berlin Critical Theory Summer School (Progress, Regression, and Social Change) in Berlin, Germany, which she co-organized with Rahel Jaeggi.

Personal life
Crary was a 1983-4 exchange student with Youth for Understanding in the southern German town of Achern.  She was also a national champion rower at the Lakeside School (Seattle) in Seattle, Washington and placed 6th in the Junior Women's Eight at the 1985 World Rowing Junior Championships in Brandenburg, Germany.  In the 1980s, after studying liberation theology with Harvey Cox at Harvard Divinity School, Crary researched Christian base communities in southern Mexico and Guatemala.  In the early 1990s, she was a teacher at the Collegio Americano in Quito, Ecuador.

Bibliography
Books – monographs
Inside Ethics: On the Demands of Moral Thought (Cambridge, Harvard University Press, 2016). (Reviewed in Notre Dame Philosophical Reviews and Hypatia as well as Environmental Philosophy, the Nordic Wittgenstein Review, La Vie des Ideés, Choice, the Kennedy Institute of Ethics Journal, and The Journal of Animal Ethics).  The book's philosophical content and linkage with liberal arts education are discussed in recent interviews at the APA blog and Social Research Matters as well as Il Sole 24 Ore (in Italian). Inside Ethics is also the subject of a 2018 Symposium at The Syndicate Network featuring commentary by Stanley Hauerwas, Anne-Marie Søndergaard Christensen, Aaron Klink, and Avner Baz, with extensive author responses (convened and edited by Sean Larson, Timothy J. Furry, and Ethan D. Smith).
Beyond Moral Judgment (Cambridge, Harvard University Press, 2007). (Reviewed in Analytic Philosophy, Choice, The European Journal of Philosophy, Ethics (twice), Hypatia, Metapsychology Online Reviews, Mind, Notre Dame Philosophical Reviews, Philo, and The Pluralist and discussed at a 2008 "Author Meets Critics" session at the Eastern Division Meeting of the APA.)
Books – edited volumes
Wittgenstein and the Moral Life: Essays in Honor of Cora Diamond (Cambridge, MIT Press, 2007).
Reading Cavell (New York, Routledge, 2006 (co-edited with Sanford Shieh)).
The New Wittgenstein (New York, Routledge, 2000 (co-edited with Rupert Read)).

See also
 American philosophy
 List of American philosophers
 List of female philosophers

References

External links
New School for Social Research Homepage
Institute for Advanced Study Homepage

1967 births
20th-century American writers
21st-century American non-fiction writers
20th-century American philosophers
20th-century American women writers
21st-century American women writers
21st-century American philosophers
American ethicists
American feminists
Philosophers from Washington (state)
Philosophers from New York (state)
American women academics
Analytic philosophers
Disability studies academics
Epistemologists
Feminist philosophers
Feminist studies scholars
Gender studies academics
Harvard College alumni
Living people
The New School faculty
Writers from Seattle
University of Pittsburgh alumni
American animal rights scholars
American women philosophers
Critics of postmodernism
Wittgensteinian philosophers
Lakeside School alumni